Odrowąż  (German Oderwanz) is a village in the administrative district of Gmina Gogolin, within Krapkowice County, Opole Voivodeship, in south-western Poland.

The village has a population of 640.

Gallery

References

Villages in Krapkowice County